Don't Blow the Inheritance is a 5:00pm daytime quiz show that aired on ITV from 20 to 31 August 2012 for a 10 episode run as a summer replacement for The Chase, the other being Tipping Point. It was hosted by stand-up comedian Tim Vine.

Format
Four teams, each composed of two family members from different generations ("offspring" and "elder"), compete on each episode to build up as large a prize pot ("inheritance fund") as possible. The two members of each team may not confer at any time and are positioned so that neither can see the other's face.

At the end of each round, the team with the lowest total is eliminated with no winnings. If there is a tie for low score, a sudden-death question is asked on the buzzer in the same format as Round One (see below); a correct answer allows the team to continue in the game, but a miss eliminates them.

Round One (Questions Requiring Answers)
The host asks a series of 15 general-knowledge toss-up questions, for which only the offspring may buzz-in. As soon as an offspring does so, that team's elder must answer the question. A correct response adds £1,000 to the team's inheritance fund, but a miss awards that amount to all three opposing teams. If an offspring buzzes-in while a question is being read, the elder must respond based only on the portion heard up to that point.

Round Two (Top 10s)
The remaining three teams play this round individually, in descending order of score. Each offspring chooses one of four categories; the host then asks a question, and the elder has 30 seconds to come up with as many of the top 10 answers as possible. (E.g. naming the 10 characters who have made the most appearances on the soap opera Coronation Street.) Every correct answer is worth £1,000; there are no penalties for incorrect answers, but the elder must wait for the host to indicate whether or not an answer is correct before giving another one.

The Semi-Final (Clues)
Three clues to a subject are revealed, one at a time. As in Round One, only the offspring may buzz-in at any time, and the corresponding elder must then guess the subject. A correct answer awards £1,000 to that team, while a miss gives the money to their opponents. A total of 10 subjects are played.

The Final Round (Rule Reversal)
The offspring of the remaining team must answer a series of questions with no help from their elder. There is initially no fixed time limit for the offspring to respond, and they win the entire inheritance fund by answering the first five questions correctly. However, upon the first miss, the fund begins to decrease in steps, at a rate of £100 per 0.4 second (£500 every two seconds). They may not return to passed or missed questions. If the offspring gives a total of five correct answers, including any given before the first miss, they win the remaining total in the inheritance fund. If the fund reaches zero, they leave with nothing.

A team can win up to £35,000 over the course of the entire game.

References

External links
 

2010s British game shows
2012 British television series debuts
2012 British television series endings
British comedy television shows
ITV game shows
Television series by ITV Studios
English-language television shows